Mark James (born Francis Rodney Zambon; November 29, 1940) is an American songwriter who wrote hits for singers B.J. Thomas, Brenda Lee, and Elvis Presley, including Presley's US number one hit single, "Suspicious Minds."

Early life 
Mark James was born and raised an Italian-American in Houston, Texas, on November 29, 1940. James befriended B.J. Thomas while both were still young.

Career

1967–1969: Career beginnings and songwriting 
By the late 1960s, James was signed as a staff songwriter to Memphis producer Chips Moman's publishing company, Moman producing Thomas’ versions of "The Eyes of a New York Woman", "Hooked on a Feeling", and "It's Only Love" from 1968 to 1969 (all of which achieved success).

James released his own version of "Suspicious Minds," also produced by Moman, on Scepter Records in 1968.

1969–1977: Continued success 
In 1972, James signed a long-term contract with Screen Gems-Columbia Music. In 1973, James' song "Sunday Sunrise" was recorded by American Country singer Brenda Lee. Brenda Lee's version was a huge hit becoming a top ten single on multiple charts in the U.S. In 1975, Canadian musician Anne Murray covered "Sunday Sunrise". Elvis Presley continued to record James' songs, "Raised On Rock", "It's Only Love", and "Moody Blue" (the title track to Presley's last studio album). But James' greatest success came with "Always on My Mind," a collaboration with Johnny Christopher and Wayne Carson and issued as a b-side by Presley in 1972.

Since 1978: Grammy wins, "Always on My Mind" covers and Mark James Trio
Mark James Trio  released the album "She's Gone Away" in 1978 on Crazy Cajun Records with fellow band members Joey Longoria and Bobby Winder.

A decade after "Always on My Mind" was released, Willie Nelson covered it and it became a huge hit for him. James won a Grammy Award for Song of the Year and Grammy Award for Best Country Song for Nelson's version. The United Kingdom's Pet Shop Boys released a successfully charting version of "Always on My Mind" in 1987 which reached No. 1 in the UK and No. 4 in the US. On October 11, 2015, James entered the Nashville Songwriters Hall of Fame.

Awards

Grammy Awards 

|-
|1983
| "Always on My Mind"
|Grammy Award for Song of the Year
| 
|-
|1983
| "Always on My Mind"
|Grammy Award for Best Country Song
| 
|-
|}

References

1940 births
Living people
Musicians from Houston
Grammy Award winners
American country singer-songwriters
Singer-songwriters from Texas
Country musicians from Texas
Writers from Houston